Mackay Radio stations are from Mackay communication since 1925. Frequencies of Mackay FM online radio are 105.9 FM, 107.8 FM.

References

External links
 Clarence H. Mackay, Harbor Hill and the Postal Telegraph

Telecommunications companies established in 1940
American companies established in 1940